Tere Bina is a Pakistani family romantic drama series, produced by Aijaz Aslam under his production banner Ice Media & Entertainment. The drama aired weekly on Geo Entertainment every Tuesday from 21 February 2017. It stars Sami Khan, Neelum Muneer and Humayun Ashraf.

Synopsis 
Tere Bina is a story of two star crossed lovers, from two completely different backgrounds. Hailing from a small town, Pakeezah (Neelum Muneer) belongs to a middle-class family where she faces a lot of restrictions by her parents. Reckless and stubborn, Pakeezah runs away from home to marry Umair (Sami Khan) which changes her life forever. To keep Pakeezah away from the eyes of everyone, Umair decides to keep her at his friend Shan's house. Uninformed by Umair's marriage to Pakeezah, Umair's family presses him to marry his cousin, Bushra. Helpless and unable to refuse, Umair marries Bushra while Pakeezah realises her worth and loses respect for Umair. Umair's divided attention forces Pakeezah to look for love and affection elsewhere.

With Bushra's wicked twists meddling in between, will Umair accept Pakeezah as his wife in front of his family?

Cast
Neelam Muneer as Pakeezah
Sami Khan as Umair
Humayun Ashraf
Shabbir Jan as Umair's father
Faria Sheikh
Farah Nadir as Abia's mother
Parveen Akbar as Pakeezah's mother
Qavi Khan as Pakeezah's father
Laila Zuberi as Umair's mother
Fahad Rehmani as Shan
Fariya Hassan as Bushra
Laila Wasti as Shan's wife
Arooba Mirza as Abia
Tabbasum Arif as Bushra's mother
Saleem Mairaj as Shehzad
Iqra Shahid
Hina Rizvi as Nazia

Soundtrack 
The theme song of Tere Bina was composed by Ayub Khawar. The song is sung by Asim Azhar and Sara Haider.

References 

Pakistani television series